Shilveh-ye Sofla (also Romanized as Shīlveh-ye Soflá; also known as Shelveh-ye Soflá and Shīlveh-ye Pā’īn) is a village in Ojarud-e Sharqi Rural District, Muran District, Germi County, Ardabil Province, Iran. At the 2006 census, its population was 117, in 22 families.

References 

Towns and villages in Germi County